Rashid Sarwar (born 3 March 1965) is a Scottish former footballer who played for Kilmarnock. Although his career at senior level was short and unremarkable, he is notable as one of very few Asian-Scots to have been involved in professional football even to that extent.

Career
Born in Paisley, Sarwar was signed for Kilmarnock by manager Eddie Morrison, who is said to have struggled with the spelling of his new recruit's personal details on the contract – including the local birthplace.

He made his competitive debut in May 1985 in a 4–1 defeat to Airdrieonians at Rugby Park, his only appearance that season. In the next campaign, 1985–86, he made 19 league starts plus one in the Scottish Cup, also scoring what proved to be his only goal in a 4–2 win over Brechin City. His final game was in August 1986, a 3–1 loss to Forfar Athletic.

Having failed to keep his place in the Kilmarnock squad, Sarwar moved on to the Junior grade with Maryhill. He later played for Ayrshire teams Glenafton Athletic and Largs Thistle (where he also served as a coach, and encountered racist abuse from supporters of his own team in 2001).

See also
 British Asians in association football

References

External links

Living people
1965 births
Footballers from Paisley, Renfrewshire
Scottish footballers
Scottish people of Pakistani descent
Association football wingers
Scottish Football League players
Scottish Junior Football Association players
Kilmarnock F.C. players
Maryhill F.C. players
Glenafton Athletic F.C. players
Largs Thistle F.C. players
British Asian footballers
British sportspeople of Pakistani descent